The Mexican cacique or yellow-winged cacique (Cassiculus melanicterus) is a species of cacique in the family Icteridae. It is found only on the west coast of Mexico and the northernmost edge of Guatemala.  It is monotypic in its own genus.

Its natural habitats are subtropical or tropical dry forests and heavily degraded former forest.

The genus Cassiculus was introduced by the English ornithologist William John Swainson in 1827.

References

Icteridae
Birds of Guatemala
Birds of Mexico
Birds described in 1825
Taxa named by Charles Lucien Bonaparte
Taxonomy articles created by Polbot